Andrew Grindeland (November 20, 1856 – October 28, 1932) was an American lawyer, judge and Minnesota state senator.

Andrew Grindeland  was born in Highlandville, Iowa. He was the son of Ingebrit Grindeland and Lucie Halstensdattir, both immigrants from Norway. He educated at the Decorah Institute in Decorah, Iowa.  He graduated from the University of Iowa law school in 1882. He opened a law practice that year in the frontier town of Warren, Minnesota. He served on the city council and as city recorder. He drafted the Warren city charter. He engaged in the real estate firm of Grindeland & Forsberg. From 1889 to 1900, he was probate judge of Marshall County, Minnesota.  He served one term in the Minnesota State Senate from 1899–1903, giving up his seat to unsuccessfully seek the Republican nomination to the U.S. House of Representatives. In 1902, he took on as an associate Julius J. Olson, who late became a Minnesota Supreme Court justice. In March 1903, Governor Samuel Van Sant appointed him to the district court bench. He was elected in 1904, and re-elected in 1910, 1916, 1922, and 1928.  He retired on November 26, 1930.

Grindeland married Inger Forde of Big Canoe in Winneshiek County, Iowa in 1882. They had one son and six daughters. His granddaughter Katherine married Oscar R. Knutson, chief justice of Minnesota, in 1968. In addition to his judicial work, he served on the boards of the Norwegian Lutheran Church of America, St. Olaf College, Luther College in Decorah and Grand Forks College in Grand Forks, North Dakota. While on the bench, he served as president of the Warren Commercial Club.  He died in Warren on October 28, 1932, of a heart attack.  His papers are reposited at the Minnesota Historical Society.

References

Further reading
Lloyd George Melgard, ed. (1956)  Warren, Plains to Plenty: A Story of 75 Eventful Years (Warren, Minn.: Warren Sheaf. pp. 91–92.)

External links
Inventory of His Papers at the Minnesota Historical Society

1856 births
1932 deaths
American people of Norwegian descent
People from Winneshiek County, Iowa
People from Warren, Minnesota
Minnesota state court judges
Minnesota state senators
Minnesota lawyers
American Lutherans
University of Iowa College of Law alumni
St. Olaf College people
People from Decorah, Iowa